A. nobile may refer to:
 Aeonium nobile, a succulent subtropical plant species
 Alangium nobile, a plant species found in Indonesia, Malaysia and Singapore

See also
 Nobile (disambiguation)